was a Japanese director and animator, best known for directing the landmark anime series Serial Experiments Lain, and for his collaboration with Masamune Shirow and Chiaki J. Konaka on Ghost Hound.

Death
In 2009, it was announced that he would be working on a new project: Despera. Production was put on hold due to Nakamura suffering from an unspecified illness. Following several months of hospitalization due to pancreatic cancer, he died on June 29, 2013. His death was announced nearly a month after.

Filmography

Director
1992: Tomcat's Big Adventure: Director, Script, Storyboard, Composition
1994: The Life of Guskou Budori: Director, Script
1995:  Legend of Crystania - The Motion Picture: Director
1996: Legend of Crystania (OVA): Director
1998: Serial Experiments Lain: Series director, Director (Eps 1, 2, 12, 13), Storyboard, Continuity (Eps 5, 6, 8, 11–13), Continuity Direction
1999: Colorful: Director, Storyboard, Episode Director (1-4,12,14,16)
2000: Sakura Wars: Series director, Continuity
2003: Kino's Journey: Director, Storyboard, Episode Director (ep 1, 2, 5)
2006: Rec: Director, Storyboard, Episode Director
2007: Kino's Journey -Country of Illness- For You-: Director
2007: Ghost Hound: Director
2013 (Posthumous): Jūgo Shōnen Hyōryūki Kaizokujima DE! Daibōken: Director
Suspended: Despera: Director

Other
1978-79: Takarajima: Key Animation
1979-80: The Rose of Versailles: Key Animation (eps 24, 26–40)
1980-81:  Ashita no Joe 2: Key Animation
1981: Unico (movie): Art
1982: Space Adventure Cobra - The Movie: Animation
1985: A Journey Through Fairyland (movie): In-Between Animation
1986: They Were Eleven (movie): Storyboard
1988: Patlabor The Mobile Police (OAV 1): Storyboard (eps 2, 4) 
1990: The Great Adventures of Robin Hood: Storyboard (eps 14, 20, 25, 31, 33, 40, 47)
1991: Legend of Heavenly Sphere Shurato: Storyboard (2)
1991:  Lupin III: "Steal Napoleon's Dictionary!": Storyboard
1991: Kikou Keisatsu Metal Jack: Storyboard (ep 30)
1991: Tenku Senki Shurato: Storyboard
1992: Tekkaman Blade: Storyboard (eps 12, 19, 25, 30)
1996: Popolocrois (game): Animation Movie Director, Story Board & Game Art
1999: Magic User's Club: Storyboard (ep 3), Episode Director (ep 3)
2000: Love Hina: Key Animation Episodes 13, 18
2001: Final Fantasy: Unlimited: Episode 2 Director/Storyboard
2002: Ghost in the Shell: Stand Alone Complex: Storyboard (ep 5), Episode Director (ep 5)

Bibliography
 Legend of Crystania - The Motion Picture Storyboard (劇場アニメーション レジェンド・オブ・クリスタニア 絵コンテ). Triangle Staff.
 visual experiments lain (ビジュアルエクスペリメンツ レイン). Sony Magazines , 1999.

References

External links

1955 births
2013 deaths
Deaths from pancreatic cancer
Anime directors
Japanese animators
Japanese animated film directors
Japanese storyboard artists